Thoughts Become Things may refer to:

 Thoughts Become Things (Skillz album), 2012
 Thoughts Become Things (Dakota album), 2009